Jakgwaecheon is a stream and popular tourist attraction in Ulju County, Ulsan, South Korea. Formed by water erosion, the stream is lined with rocks that have been carved with the names of poetry contest winners. This area is also famous for being the center of the March 1st Movement in Eonyang.

See also
List of South Korean tourist attractions

References

Tourist attractions in Ulsan
Ulju County